Hyrcanolestes is a monotypic genus containing the single species Hyrcanolestes velitaris, a predatory air-breathing land slug. It is a shell-less pulmonate gastropod mollusc in the family Trigonochlamydidae.

The generic name Hyrcanolestes contains the suffix -lestes, that means "robber".

Distribution 
The distribution of Hyrcanolestes velitaris includes:
 Iran
 Lankaran Lowland, Azerbaijan
 Talysh Mountains
 Lesser Caucasus
 Greater Caucasus

The type locality of Hyrcanolestes velitaris is Gorgan, northern Iran.

Ecology 
Hyrcanolestes velitaris inhabits forests.

References 

Trigonochlamydidae
Gastropods described in 1880
Monotypic gastropod genera